Bharosa is a Hindi film released in 1963. The film is remembered for the music and songs. The music for the film was composed by Ravi. Rajendra Krishan penned the lyrics of the songs. Woh Dil Kahan Se Laun rendered by Lata Mangeshkar is an all-time favourite song.

Plot
Raunaklal (Kanhaiyalal) is the servant of a rich man Ramdas who suffers from tuberculosis and believes himself to be on the point of death; he gives Raunaklal a large sum of money to look after his little son, Bansi. Raunaklal moves to a village with his wife, son and Bansi where he brings up Bansi as a menial. Bansi (Guru Dutt) is simple and good-hearted, while Raunaklal's son Deepak (Sudesh Kumar), though sent to the city for education, pursues a rich man's daughter (Neena). Bansi falls in love with a village belle, Gomti (Asha Parekh) but Raunaklal tries to put obstacles in the way of their marriage. However, in due time all ends well.

Cast
 Guru Dutt as Bansi
 Asha Parekh as Gomti
 Mehmood as Platform MPPS
 Om Prakash as Laxmi Prasad 
 Shivraj as Ramdas
 Nana Palsikar as Shivcharandas
 Kanhaiyalal as Raunaklal
 Sulochana Chatterjee as Laxmi
 Lalita Pawar as Dhanno 
 Shubha Khote as Double Roti
 Sudesh Kumar as Deepak
 Sayee Subbulakshmi as Dancers (In The Song "Dhadka, O Dil Dhadka")

Music

References

External links 
 

1963 films
Indian black-and-white films
1960s Hindi-language films
Films scored by Ravi
Films directed by K. Shankar